Sarah Jankovska (born 13 August 1999) is a Danish football player who plays as a midfielder for HB Køge in Denmark top-division Elitedivisionen and for the Danish national team.

International career
She has appeared for the Danish national junior team, several times. In November 2018, she made her debut for the Denmark women's national under-23 football team, against Finland.

Jankovska made her debut for the Denmark national team on 27 February 2019 at the 2019 Algarve Cup against the Noreay, as substitute for Pernille Harder.

Personal life
Jankovska is of Macedonian descent and she received Danish citizenship in 2018.

References

External links
 Profile at the Danish Football Union
 Sarah Jankovska at Soccerdonna
 

1999 births
Living people
Danish women's footballers
Denmark women's international footballers
Women's association football midfielders
Footballers from Copenhagen